Oxyrhopus occipitalis is a neotropical snake of the family Dipsadidae. It occurs in Brazil, Guyana, Surinam, French Guiana and Venezuela. It is often confused with Oxyrhopus formosus, a Brazilian species. Oxyrhopus occipitalis is more slender, the snout is yellow and the top of the head is brown, adults are red with very faint darker bands; O. formosus is more robust, the head is entirely yellow, and adults have obvious transverse dark bands

References

Oxyrhopus
Reptiles described in 1824
Snakes of South America
Reptiles of Brazil
Reptiles of Guyana
Reptiles of French Guiana
Reptiles of Suriname
Reptiles of Venezuela
Taxa named by Prince Maximilian of Wied-Neuwied